Oddness may refer to:

 Eccentricity (behavior)
 Oddness of numbers, for which see parity (mathematics)